The Steck-Salathé Route is a technical climbing route up Sentinel Rock.

History
They climbed mostly free using occasional direct aid pitons on some pitches, and a blank wall halfway up required a 30-foot bolt ladder. It was the longest and most difficult route in Yosemite in 1950.

The route was repeated several times in the 50s using less and less aid.  In 1959, Royal Robbins and Tom Frost did it all free except for the short bolt ladder, producing the most strenuous long free climb in America, with 6 pitches of 5.10a or 5.9, and many tiring 5.8 leads.

In 1970, Steve Wunsch and Jim Erickson discovered a long finger/hand-size crack to the left of the bolt ladder, adding yet another 5.9+ pitch, which allowed the wall to be climbed totally free.

In 1973, Henry Barber made the first free solo ascent, on sight, in record time, 2 hours 45 minutes.

The route is recognized in the historic climbing text Fifty Classic Climbs of North America. It is famous for its large cracks: out of 18 pitches, 15 feature either offwidth cracks or squeeze chimneys, including what is arguably the most famous squeeze chimney in the world, the Narrows.

Derek Hersey died while free soloing the route in 1993. His fall from several hundred feet was suspected to be due to a slippery rock, coated with moisture.

References

External links 
supertopo
rockclimbing.com
mountainproject.com

Climbing routes
Yosemite National Park